The Northern Arizona Lumberjacks women's basketball team represents Northern Arizona University, located in Flagstaff, Arizona, in NCAA Division I women's competition. The school's team competes in the Big Sky Conference.  Loree Payne, formerly the head coach at the University of Puget Sound, was named the head coach of the lumberjacks in April 2017. The women's basketball team reached the conference  tournament championship in 2023.

Team record

Postseason appearances
The Lumberjacks have made one NCAA Tournament appearance. They have a record of 0–1.

References

External links